St Peter's Academy is a higher-secondary co-education private school in the Patiala city of Punjab, India. The school was founded in 1970 and is affiliated to the Central Board of Secondary Education of India. This school was started in 1970 by Rev. Fr. P.M. Lewis in the Premises of the Church. Earlier, it was just a primary school.

NOC was obtained from the Directorate of Higher Education, Himachal Pradesh Vide No. 18/9/85-5/3017Chandigarh dated 20/12/1985 and the School is recognized by the Directorate, Education Deptt., Punjab, Chandigarh
The School is affiliated on a regular basis with the Affiliation No. 1630052 since 1987 and later the School was upgraded to Class 12 from 2013. The affiliation to Class 12 is received till the year 2016.
The school is managed by Simla Chandigarh Educational Society, Catholic Church, Sector 19 A, Chandigarh and permanently registered under the Section 25 of the Company Act, 1956.
The School has a Committee to look in to the incidents of Sexual Harassment in the school campus.
Area of School Campus:
IN ACRES	1378.71 Acres
IN SQ. MTRS.	1621.84 Sq. Mtrs.
BUILT UP AREA (SQ. MTRS)	Sq. Mtrs.
AREA OF PLAYGROUND IN SQMTRS	Sq. Mtrs.

References 

Co-educational schools in India
High schools and secondary schools in Patiala
Educational institutions established in 1970
1970 establishments in Punjab, India
Christian schools in Punjab, India